Tokanui  is a rural locality in the Waipa District and Waikato region of New Zealand's North Island.

It is located southwest of Te Awamutu.  runs to the east of the locality.

History
Te Mawhai railway station operated from 1887 to 1962, originally as Te Puhi railway station.

Tokanui is the site of the former Tokanui Psychiatric Hospital, which operated from 1912 to 1997. The closure of the hospital resulted in the loss of 600 jobs, and there was little alternative employment available in the area.

Tokanui Crossroads Hall 
It is a converted casein factory, which had been working since at least 1919.

Demographics
The SA1 area is part of the larger Tokanui statistical area.

The SA1 area had a population of 144 at the 2018 New Zealand census, a decrease of 18 people (−11.1%) since the 2013 census, and a decrease of 9 people (−5.9%) since the 2006 census. There were 48 households, comprising 75 males and 69 females, giving a sex ratio of 1.09 males per female. The median age was 26.5 years (compared with 37.4 years nationally), with 39 people (27.1%) aged under 15 years, 36 (25.0%) aged 15 to 29, 57 (39.6%) aged 30 to 64, and 12 (8.3%) aged 65 or older.

Ethnicities were 66.7% European/Pākehā and 54.2% Māori. People may identify with more than one ethnicity.

Although some people chose not to answer the census's question about religious affiliation, 56.2% had no religion, 25.0% were Christian, 2.1% had Māori religious beliefs and 2.1% had other religions.

Of those at least 15 years old, 9 (8.6%) people had a bachelor's or higher degree, and 27 (25.7%) people had no formal qualifications. The median income was $26,500, compared with $31,800 nationally. 12 people (11.4%) earned over $70,000 compared to 17.2% nationally. The employment status of those at least 15 was that 54 (51.4%) people were employed full-time, 12 (11.4%) were part-time, and 9 (8.6%) were unemployed.

Tokanui statistical area

The statistical area had a population of 435 at the 2018 New Zealand census, a decrease of 6 people (−1.4%) since the 2013 census, and an increase of 9 people (2.1%) since the 2006 census. There were 144 households, comprising 231 males and 207 females, giving a sex ratio of 1.12 males per female. The median age was 31.6 years (compared with 37.4 years nationally), with 105 people (24.1%) aged under 15 years, 102 (23.4%) aged 15 to 29, 195 (44.8%) aged 30 to 64, and 33 (7.6%) aged 65 or older.

Ethnicities were 66.2% European/Pākehā, 54.5% Māori, 2.8% Pacific peoples, 3.4% Asian, and 1.4% other ethnicities. People may identify with more than one ethnicity.

The percentage of people born overseas was 11.0, compared with 27.1% nationally.

Although some people chose not to answer the census's question about religious affiliation, 51.7% had no religion, 28.3% were Christian, 7.6% had Māori religious beliefs, 0.7% were Hindu and 2.1% had other religions.

Of those at least 15 years old, 33 (10.0%) people had a bachelor's or higher degree, and 81 (24.5%) people had no formal qualifications. The median income was $28,700, compared with $31,800 nationally. 45 people (13.6%) earned over $70,000 compared to 17.2% nationally. The employment status of those at least 15 was that 165 (50.0%) people were employed full-time, 54 (16.4%) were part-time, and 21 (6.4%) were unemployed.

Tokanui hill 
The hill has been quarried since 1925, as Osterns, Te Kawa or McFalls Quarry. Argillitic greywacke, one of the Manaia Hill group of rocks, of Late Jurassic to Early Cretaceous age, is used for aggregate. There are three pā sites on the hill, Whiti Te Marama, Tokonui and Pukerimu, which are linked to Ngāti Whakatere and Ngāti Maniapoto.

See also

References

Waipa District
Cambridge, New Zealand
Populated places in Waikato